The 831st Brigade of Tactical Aviation (Military Unit Number A1356) is a formation of the Ukrainian Air Force, composed primarily of Sukhoi Su-27 aircraft, that is based at Myrhorod Air Base.

Soviet predecessor of the brigade 
The 659th Fighter Aviation Regiment was formed in Krasnovodsk (now Turkmenbashi Turkmenistan) at the end of 1941. During the first two months of combat operations, the regiment carried out 123 sorties (13 of them, nightly), was involved in 13 air battles, shot down 8 enemy aircraft, and destroyed 22 motor vehicles, 112 wagons and two steam locomotives.

In the German-Soviet War, the regiment possessed I-15bis, Yak-1, Yak-7B fighters and carried out 9960 combat missions in 10,451 hours, conducted 531 air battles, destroyed 417 planes and 838 units of military equipment.

On 29 December 1944, for the courage and heroism of the regiments personnel, manifested in the liberation of the cities Galati and Izmail for which the regiment was awarded the honorary title "Galatsky". In 1945, for the execution of combat tasks during the Danube River overrun and the breakthrough of the enemy's defense, the regiment was awarded the Order of Kutuzov, III Degree, and for the liberation of Budapest, an Order of the Red Banner.

The regiment was renumbered as the 831st Fighter Aviation Regiment by a 10 January 1949 order, effective 20 February 1949.

Current regiment 
On 13 January 1992 the regiment took the oath of loyalty to the Ukrainian people.

In 1996, pilots of the Mirgorod regiment participated in a military parade to honor the 5th Independence Day of Ukraine. Four Su-27s accompanied a Tu-160 strategic missile carrier. In 1998, the Su-27UB colonel and Ivan Chernenko completed a transatlantic flight to United States at Seymour Johnson Air Force Base. Mirgorod military pilots participated in international air shows on the airfields of European countries including the United Kingdom, Czech Republic, Slovakia, Austria, Romania, and Turkey. During the 2004 Slovak International Air Display a flight by the Su-27 fighter pilot Lieutenant Colonel Fedor Vyshchuk was recognized as the best individual flight.

On 1 August 2003, the fighter aircraft regiment and 24 aircraft base were redeployed to the aviation fighter brigade. On 25 January 2005 the fighter air force was subordinated to the Air Command of the Air Force "Center" of the Armed Forces of Ukraine.

19 July, – 26 July 2011 the active phase of the Ukrainian-American-Polish military exercise "Safe Sky 2011" was held in the Poltava region at which military aircraft and helicopters carried out anti-terrorist actions aimed at protecting against an attack. Su-27, MiG-29, L-39, Antonov An-26, Mi-8, F-16C, and C-130 aircraft took part in the exercises. The 831th Brigade pilots interacted with the pilots of the 144th Fighter Wing, California Air National Guard.

25 November 2011 was the day of the 70th anniversary of the creation of the 831st Tactical Aviation Brigade Battle Flags.

Currently, the Brigade is a part of the Rapid Reaction Force in the system APO. Three planes are based on the Odesa school airfield.

On 10 February 2016, Ukrainian President Petro Poroshenko, to perpetuate the memory of the heroic Lieutenant-General , the invincibility of spirit in the struggle for independent Ukrainian the state, taking into account the professionalism and exemplary accomplishment of the tasks of the 831 Guards Brigade of the Tactical Aviation of the Air Forces of the Armed Forces of Ukraine, by decree assigned an Su-27 [aircraft number 50 blue] 831 guards tactical brigade. The name of Vasyl Nikiforov Su-27 aircraft (flight number 50), 831 of the Guards Brigade of the Air Force's Armed Forces tactical aviation was assigned.

On 1 December 2018 the brigade received an upgraded Su-27S1M and two L-39 M1.

Accidents 
On 16 October 2018, during the multinational exercises Clean Sky-2018, an Su-27UB airplane of the brigade ("70 Blue") crashed at about 17.00 during a training flight in the field near the village of Ulan, Vinnitsa Oblast. An international air crew including Colonel Ivan N. Nikolaevich Petrenko, the Deputy Commander of aviation, the chief of Aviation Air Command East, and a serviceman of the U.S. Air National Guard, were killed.

References

Air force brigades of Ukraine